Women Is Losers is a 2021 American drama film written and directed by Lissette Feliciano. It stars Lorenza Izzo, Bryan Craig, Chrissie Fit, Simu Liu, Steven Bauer, Liza Weil, Cranston Johnson, Alejandra Miranda, Shalim Ortiz and Lincoln Bonilla. The film follows the life of a young woman from her formative years to adulthood in 1960s San Francisco. The film’s title is derived from a Janis Joplin song.

The film had its world premiere at South by Southwest on March 16, 2021. It was released on October 25, 2021, by HBO Max.

Plot
In 1967 San Francisco, Celina Guerrera is a studious teenager who attends a Catholic high school and is from a conservative immigrant family. When the course of her life is altered by an unplanned pregnancy, Celina sets out to rise above poverty and invest in a future for herself.

Cast
 Lorenza Izzo as Celina
 Bryan Craig as Mateo
 Chrissie Fit as Marty
 Simu Liu as Gilbert
 Steven Bauer as Don Juan
 Liza Weil as Minerva
 Cranston Johnson as Calvin 
 Alejandra Miranda as Dona Carolina
 Shalim Ortiz as Carlos
 Lincoln Bonilla as Christian

Production
In February 2019, Deadline Hollywood announced Lorenza Izzo would star in the film written and directed by Lissette Feliciano in her feature directorial debut. 

In March 2019, it was announced Bryan Craig joined the cast and The Hollywood Reporter announced Liza Weil and Simu Liu joined the feminist indie drama. The film was shot on location in San Francisco.

Release
The film had its world premiere at South by Southwest on March 16, 2021. In September 2021, HBO Max acquired distribution rights to the film, and set it for an October 25, 2021, release.

Reception
Women Is Losers holds a 72% approval rating on the review aggregator website Rotten Tomatoes. The website's consensus reads, "While it might have benefited from a subtler approach to its message, Women Is Losers is elevated by outstanding work from lead Lorenza Izzo." Kate Erbland of IndieWire gave the film a B−, writing Women Is Losers “is an infectious and auspicious debut…surely the start of something wonderful for [Lissette] Feliciano”.

Variety also praised Izzo’s performance, with critic Tomris Laffly saying, “Izzo delivers a vibrant performance that reinforces her fascinating acting range…It’s a rewarding experience to watch Izzo thread a tricky line with ease here, emitting both a child-like innocence and gradual steeliness that slowly yet convincingly sharpens and matures”.

Accolades 
The film has won numerous accolades including, the Audience Award at the 2021 Mill Valley Film Festival, the Richard D. Propes Social Impact Award for Narrative Feature at the 2021 Heartland International Film Festival, Best Narrative Feature at the 2021 Cordillera International Film Festival, American Independents Award at the 2021 Cleveland International Film Festival, Best Narrative Feature award at the 2021 Columbus International Film & Animation Festival. Best Narrative Feature at the 2021 Naples International Film Festival, Best Narrative Feature at the 2021 Oxford Film Festival, Best First Time Director at the 2021 San Diego International Film Festival, Best Actress and Best Director at the Breckenridge Film Festival, Best Editor at the Ouray International Film Festival and the Bay Area Filmmaker Award at the 2021 Sonoma International Film Festival.

References

External links
 

2021 films
2021 directorial debut films
2021 drama films
2021 independent films
2020s American films
2020s coming-of-age drama films
2020s English-language films
2020s feminist films
2020s pregnancy films
American coming-of-age drama films
American feminist films
American independent films
American pregnancy films
Bowery Hills Entertainment films
Films about abortion
Films about poverty in the United States
Films scored by Frederik Wiedmann
Films set in 1960
Films set in San Francisco
Films shot in San Francisco
HBO Max films